Eve Carina Jessica Ståhl Herrstedt (born Herrstedt on 26 February 1971) is a Swedish journalist and politician representing the Sweden Democrats in the Parliament of Sweden (Riksdag) since the 2010 election. Since 2009 she has served as the second vice-president of the Sweden Democrats (SD) and is the chairwoman of SD-Women.

Career 
Ståhl Herrstedt was employed as a care assistant for a number of years. She initially voted for the Swedish Social Democrats before joining the SD. During the 2010 Swedish general election, she was elected as a representative for the SD and at the same time was elected as a municipal councilor on  Landskrona municipal council.

Ståhl Herrstedt argues that immigration should be greatly reduced, and that the money that could be saved for the state in that way should instead be used for health care, education, elderly care and social work. She also supports tougher law & order policies and a social system that "does not discriminate or give special rights to certain groups."

In addition to her political work, she is a columnist for Aftonbladet newspaper. In 2010, she co-wrote an article with SD leader Jimmie Akesson in which they apologized for homophobic and LGBT-hostile statements made by individual representatives of the Sweden Democrats over the years. At the same time, they warned of the "gay hatred that the increasing Islamization brings." In 2010, she was threatened with a defamation lawsuit by Swedish Communist Party leader Jan Jönsson and his son after she published a number of articles accusing them of criminal activity. Jimmie Åkesson defended her articles by stating "But there are political things behind it and this is about a left-wing extremist in Malmö who reported her. I have no problem with what she did." In 2016, she became the source of some controversy after an email she sent in 2011 to her then partner was leaked to the media and was accused of containing racist and antiziganist content. She later apologised for the email but denied accusations of racism and pointed out the email was intended as an ironic joke and had been copied from a meme on an internet forum.

Personal life
Ståhl Herrstedt lives in Asmundtorp and has been married to fellow SD politician Jimmy Ståhl since 2017. She has two children by her former partner.

References

External links
 Official blog
 Valpejl.se
 Official profile at Twitter

1971 births
Living people
People from Kristianstad Municipality
Anti-Islam sentiment in Sweden
Women members of the Riksdag
Swedish journalists
Members of the Riksdag 2010–2014
Members of the Riksdag 2014–2018
Members of the Riksdag 2018–2022
Members of the Riksdag 2022–2026
Members of the Riksdag from the Sweden Democrats
21st-century Swedish politicians
21st-century Swedish women politicians